Metameris is a genus of fungi in the family Phaeosphaeriaceae. This is a monotypic genus, containing the single species Metameris japonica.

References

Phaeosphaeriaceae
Monotypic Dothideomycetes genera